Lothar Noack (born 31 January 1953) is a German former swimmer. He competed in the men's 200 metre backstroke at the 1972 Summer Olympics.

References

External links
 

1953 births
Living people
East German male backstroke swimmers
Olympic swimmers of East Germany
Swimmers at the 1972 Summer Olympics
Swimmers from Dresden